The Swale Stakes is a Grade III American Thoroughbred horse race for three year old  horses  at the distance of seven furlongs on the dirt held annually in January at Gulfstream Park, Hallandale Beach, Florida.  The event currently carries a purse of $125,000.

History

The race was named in honor of Claiborne Farm's brilliant colt Swale who won the 1984 Florida Derby, Kentucky Derby and the Belmont Stakes but who died suddenly of a heart attack eight days after his Belmont victory. In 2021 Claiborne Farm are the sponsors of the event.

The inaugural running of the event was on 2 March 1985 as the tenth race on the Florida Derby racecard over a distance of seven furlongs. The event was won by the 1984 United States Champion 2-year-old colt, Chief's Crown who was resuming after his Breeders' Cup Juvenile victory at Hollywood Park Racetrack victory easily dispatched the field winning by  lengths as the 3/10 odds-on favorite.

The event was not held in 1987.

In 1990 the event was upgraded to a Grade III and once again to Grade II in 2006.

For two runnings of the event, in 2007 and 2008 the race was run over the shorter  furlongs distance.

In 2009, Big Drama set a new stakes and track record of 1:20.88 but was disqualified and placed second with the race awarded to This Ones for Phil.

This race was upgraded once again to a Grade II for its 2014 running but then downgraded again to Grade III in 2018.

Records 

Speed  record: 
 7 furlongs – 1:20.88  This Ones For Phil (2009) 
  furlongs – 1:15.06  Eaton's Gift (2008)

Margins:
  lengths –  D'wildcat  (2001)

Most wins by a jockey:
 5 – Luis Saez    (2013, 2015, 2018, 2022, 2023)

Most wins by a trainer:
 4 – Claude R. McGaughey III (1988, 1989, 1996, 2023)

Most wins by an owner:
 2 –  Ogden Phipps  (1988, 1989)
 2 –  Dogwood Stable  (1994, 2000)
 2 –  Paul P. Pompa Jr.   (2009, 2010)
 2 –  Michael Dubb  (2009, 2019)
 2 –  Courtlandt Farms (2018, 2023)
Notes

Winners

Notes:

† In the 2009 Big Drama was first past the post but was disqualified for bumping This Ones for Phil twice in the straight thus This Ones for Phil was declared the winner.

See also
List of American and Canadian Graded races

External links
 2020–21 Gulfstream Park Media Guide

References

Recurring sporting events established in 1985
Horse races in Florida
Gulfstream Park
Flat horse races for three-year-olds
Triple Crown Prep Races
Graded stakes races in the United States
Grade 3 stakes races in the United States
1985 establishments in Florida